Hasselmann or Haßelmann is a German surname. Notable people with the surname include:

Britta Haßelmann (born 1961), German politician
Joice Hasselmann (born 1978), Brazilian journalist
Karl Hasselmann (1883–1966), German cinematographer
Klaus Hasselmann (born 1931), German oceanographer and climate modeller
Nina Hasselmann (born 1986), German field hockey player
Wilhelm Hasselmann (1844–1916), German socialist politician and activist

Variants
Variant spellings include Haselman, Hasselman, and Hasselmans.Notable people with such surnames include the below, listed alphabetically by given name.
Alphonse Hasselmans (1845–1912), Belgium-born French harpist, composer, and pedagogue
Ben Hasselman (1898–1984), Dutch military figure
Bill Haselman (born 1966), American baseball player and coach
Louis Hasselmans (1878–1957), French cellist and conductor

See also
The Hasselmann Painter, ancient Greek vase painter of the mid-5th century BC

German-language surnames
de:Hasselmann